Bareli is a town and a Nagar Palika in Raisen district in the state of Madhya Pradesh, India. It is located in the Bareli tehsil. Bareli is a town in the Raisen district. There is a sub-jail in Bareli. Bareli is located on bank of Barna River.
Bareli has National Krishi Upaj Mandi and it produces Wheat, Soyabean, Rice and different vegetable in different seasons. Bareli is connected with National Highway that connects to Bhopal and Jabalpur via NH-12(or NH-45)

Education 

There are many schools and colleges in Bareli affiliated to state and CBSE boards. Main educational institutes of education by the modern way of learning are Shri Maniklal Nahar international school (first school to become cbse till 12th class) Daffodils public school  "Saraswati Shishu Vidhya mandir " Daffodils public school, Gurukul English medium school, Kidzee school (for playgroups), Sanskar Bhoomi School . Maria Vidhya Sadan is the oldest English medium CBSE Christian missionary school in the town. There are so many private colleges i.e. Gurukripa college, princeton college, anantam college, and a single government college That conduct examination of all the private college and of all the college that are nearby of bareli town.

Transport 
Bareli is located beside National Highway 12 (NH-12), which connects it with the state capital Bhopal and Jabalpur and it starts form Jaipur to Jabalpur. The distance from Bhopal to Bareli is 120 km and from Bareli to Jabalpur is 200 km. It is also connected to other cities including Jaipur, Kota, Pipariya, Pachmarhi, Begumganj and Sagar. Bareli do not have railway connection but it is richly connected by roadways, some of the roadways companies connecting the routes are Shubham Travels, Atwal Travels, RK Verma etc. Nearest Railway Station is Pipariya which is 40 km from Bareli and nearest airport from Bareli is Raja Bhoj International Airport Bhopal.

Geography
Bareli is located at 23.0°.23°°N 78.13°.48°°E.[1] It has an average elevation of 492 metres (1614 feet).

Demographics
 India census, Bareli had a population of 25,216. Males constitute 53% of the population and females 47%. Baraily has an average literacy rate of 69%, higher than the national average of 59.5%; with 58% of the males and 42% of females literate. 15% of the population is under 6 years of age.
As per 2011 census, Bareli had total population of 34,663.

General
Baraily is well known for its Sharbati variety of Wheat and Soybean and latterly for its rice production. Recent interest in Rice grain amongst local farmers has led to ample production of the product in the area

Barna is the nearest river in Bareli.

Best Shopping Stations are, Reliance Trends, Akarsh Mart, Abhishek sarees, Didi garments, Mangal shree sarres, Bitiya garments, Manali sarees, Western Look Fashion Clothes, Ranisa Collection, Near Bazaar Road.

Nearest places to visit near Bareli are, Shri Hanuman Gadi Temple, Shri Chhind Dham Hanuman Temple (8.1 km), Jamgarh Caves (25 km), Osho Tirth Kuchwada (24 km), Barna Dam Badi (25 km), Hinglaj Mata Temple (20 km).

The nearest Railway Station is Pipariya (PPI) which is   42 km away and the nearest airport is Raja Bhoj Airport Bhopal which is 129 km away.

Tourist Sites 
 Chheend Mandir (Hanuman Temple) - 8 km
 Kuchawada (Birthplace of the Osho Rajneesh) - 23 km
 Hanuman Gadi (Hanuman Temple) - 2 km 
 
 Bari (Digambar Jain Temple, Barna Dam and Hinglaj Mandir) - 18 km
 Panchmari (Hill Station) - 85 km
 Jaamgarh (Birthplace of Jambavanta) - 20 km
 Khargone (Khona bale baba Jain temple) - 14 km

References

2: http://www.censusindia.gov.in/pca/SearchDetails.aspx?Id=543534

Cities and towns in Raisen district
Raisen